Nora Heroum (born 20 July 1994) is a Finnish professional footballer who plays as a defender or midfielder for Italian Serie A club Parma and the Finland national team. She previously played for HJK, FC Honka and Åland United of the Finnish Naisten Liiga, Danish club Fortuna Hjørring, English club Brighton & Hove Albion and Italian Serie A clubs Brescia, AC Milan and Lazio.

Club career

Brighton & Hove Albion 
Brighton & Hove Albion released Heroum at the end of the 2020–21 Women's Super League season in May 2021.

International career
Heroum played her first international for Finland women's national team on 27 May 2012 against Belgium. She was a member of the Finnish squad at the UEFA Women's Euro 2013. Aged 18 she was one of the youngest players at the competition and had to withdraw from the 2013 UEFA Women's U-19 Championship in order to participate.

After Finland failed to qualify in 2017, Heroum was considered an important member of the national team which competed at UEFA Women's Euro 2022 in England.

Playing style
Originally an attacking midfielder who modelled her game on Pavel Nedvěd, Heroum was retrained as a full-back by her coach at Milan, Carolina Morace.

International goals

Personal life
Although she was born and raised in Finland, Heroum's father is originally from Morocco. Her brother Samir is also a footballer.

References

External links
 
 
 
 Profile at Football Association of Finland (SPL) 

1994 births
Finnish women's footballers
Finnish expatriate footballers
Finland women's international footballers
Finnish people of Moroccan descent
Living people
Kansallinen Liiga players
Helsingin Jalkapalloklubi (women) players
Åland United players
FC Honka (women) players
Fortuna Hjørring players
Expatriate women's footballers in Denmark
Finnish expatriate sportspeople in Denmark
FC Viikingit players
Finnish expatriate sportspeople in Italy
A.C.F. Brescia Calcio Femminile players
Serie A (women's football) players
Expatriate women's footballers in Italy
Women's association football midfielders
A.C. Milan Women players
Brighton & Hove Albion W.F.C. players
Footballers from Helsinki
UEFA Women's Euro 2022 players
Parma Calcio 2022 players